René Bary (died in 1680) was a French historiographer and rhetorician author of La Rhétorique française où pour principale augmentation l'on trouve les secrets de nostre langue published in Paris (1653) for the female audience of the précieuses. Indeed, he wrote many books to speak well and also La Défense de la jalousie in 1642.

Publications (selection) 
1642: La Défense de la jalousie 
1653: La Rhétorique française où pour principale augmentation l'on trouve les secrets de nostre langue
1658: Actions publiques sur la rhétorique françoise 
1660: La fine philosophie, accommodée à l'intelligence des dames  
1662: L'esprit de cour, ou Les conversations galantes , divisées en cent dialogues... par René Bary
1679: Méthode pour bien prononcer un discours et pour le bien animer...

External links 
 René Bary on data.bnf.fr
 Works by René Bary on Gallica
 Bary, René on Scholasticon
 Possible portrait of Bary by Jean Frosne

French historiographers
1680 deaths